The Eyalet of Vidin was an administrative territorial entity of the Ottoman Empire located in the territory of present-day north-western Bulgaria. It was formed in 1846 and its administrative centre was Vidin. It was incorporated into Danube Province in 1864 and its sanjaks were reduced to townships except Vidin.

Administrative divisions
Sanjaks of the Eyalet in the mid-19th century:
 Sanjak of Tirnova
 Sanjak of Vidin
 Sanjak of Lom

See also
Ottoman Bulgaria
Osman Pazvantoğlu

References

Ottoman period in the history of Bulgaria
Eyalets of the Ottoman Empire in Europe
States and territories established in 1846
1846 establishments in the Ottoman Empire
History of Vidin
1864 disestablishments in the Ottoman Empire